John Harvey Baldwin (April 4, 1851 – June 19, 1924) was an American lawyer and politician.

Baldwin was born in Jonesborn, Grant County, Indiana and went to Spiceland Academy in Spiceland, Indiana. He was admitted to the Indiana bar in 1876 and practiced law in Grant County, Indiana. In 1882, Baldwin moved to Hand County, Dakota Territory and continued to practice law. He served as the South Dakota State Water Engineer for four years. In 1900, Baldwin moved to Freeze, Becker County, Minnesota and continued to practice law. He served in the Minnesota Senate, from 1915 to 1922, and was a Republican.

References

1851 births
1924 deaths
People from Becker County, Minnesota
People from Grant County, Indiana
People from Hand County, South Dakota
Indiana lawyers
Minnesota lawyers
South Dakota lawyers
Republican Party Minnesota state senators